Henry Youmans Mott (October 9, 1855 – October 7, 1946) was a journalist, author and political figure in Newfoundland. He represented Burgeo and LaPoile in the Newfoundland and Labrador House of Assembly from 1894 to 1900.

He was born in Dartmouth, Nova Scotia, the son of Henry Mott and Rebecca Walker. Mott originally apprenticed in the pharmaceutical business but then trained as a  piano tuner and came to St. John's in 1877. Mott served as editor of the Temperance Journal for a time. In 1890, Mott married Alice M. Bowden. Mott was speaker for the Newfoundland assembly from 1897 to 1900. He was editor of the Daily News from 1898 to 1906. Mott served as chief clerk for the House of Assembly from 1912 to 1934. He died in St. John's at the age of 90.

Mott was the author of Newfoundland men: a collection of biographical sketches, with portraits, of sons and residents of the island who have become known in commercial, professional, and political life, published in 1894.

References 

1855 births
1946 deaths
Speakers of the Newfoundland and Labrador House of Assembly
Writers from Halifax, Nova Scotia
Writers from Newfoundland and Labrador
People from Dartmouth, Nova Scotia
Newfoundland Colony people
Dominion of Newfoundland people